Korean knives are a sub-division of Korean swords in that both have been used or are used for martial arts purposes, and as well in the martial arts. This article gives a brief introduction to this interesting field within the greater sphere of Korean martial arts.

History of Korean knives

Korean knife fighting
In Korean dramas depicting ancient times, knives are often used. Usually, assassins and pirates used them to kill government officials or immobilize guards.

Korean knives were either thrown at the target or the assailant would creep up behind the guard and slice his throat.

Types of knives
all of them have sheathes 
 Dan Geom (small knife, usually with a curved hilt) (단검)
 Bi Su (hidden knife, commonly used by assassins) (비수), also used for combat in Hapkido
 Jang Do (small knife used for self-defense, usually carried by women) (장도)

Korean knife making masters

Choe Yong-Mook (초용묵)
Park Yong-Ki (박용기)
Choi Sang-Gil (최상길)

See also
Korean sword

External links
 Korean knife museum

Weapons of Korea
Knives